In enzymology, 6,7-dihydropteridine reductase (also Dihydrobiopterin reductase) is an enzyme that catalyzes the chemical reaction

 5,6,7,8-tetrahydropteridine + NAD(P)+  6,7-dihydropteridine + NAD(P)H + H+

The four substrates for this enzyme are a 6,7-dihydropteridine (dihydrobiopterin), NADH, NADPH, and H+ and its three products are 5,6,7,8-tetrahydropteridine (tetrahydrobiopterin), NAD+, and NADP+ This enzyme participates in folate biosynthesis. In the human genome, the enzyme is encoded by the QDPR gene.

Nomenclature 
This enzyme belongs to the family of oxidoreductases, specifically those acting on the CH-NH group of donors with NAD+ or NADP+ as acceptor.  The systematic name of this enzyme class is 5,6,7,8-tetrahydropteridine:NAD(P)+ oxidoreductase. Other names in common use include 6,7-dihydropteridine:NAD(P)H oxidoreductase, DHPR, NAD(P)H:6,7-dihydropteridine oxidoreductase, NADH-dihydropteridine reductase, NADPH-dihydropteridine reductase, NADPH-specific dihydropteridine reductase, dihydropteridine (reduced nicotinamide adenine dinucleotide), reductase, dihydropteridine reductase, dihydropteridine reductase (NADH), and 5,6,7,8-tetrahydropteridine:NAD(P)H+ oxidoreductase.

Clinical significance 

Dihydropteridine reductase deficiency is a defect in the regeneration of tetrahydrobiopterin. Many patients have significant developmental delays despite therapy, develop brain abnormalities, and are prone to sudden death. The reason is not completely clear, but might be related to the accumulation of dihydrobiopterin and abnormal metabolism of folic acid. Response to treatment is variable and the long-term and functional outcome is unknown. To provide a basis for improving the understanding of the epidemiology, genotype/phenotype correlation and outcome of these diseases their impact on the quality of life of patients, and for evaluating diagnostic and therapeutic strategies a patient registry was established by the noncommercial International Working Group on Neurotransmitter Related Disorders (iNTD). Dihydropteridine reductase deficiency is treated with tyrosine supplements, a controlled diet which is lacking in phenylalanine, well as supplementation of L-DOPA.

See also
 Sepiapterin reductase

References

Further reading 

 
 
 
 
 

EC 1.5.1
NADPH-dependent enzymes
NADH-dependent enzymes
Enzymes of known structure